The Mehrbach is a river,  long, and a tributary of the Wied.

Course 
The Mehrbach rises in the north of the Westerwald, north of Werkhausen, in the vicinity of the border between Rhineland-Palatinate and North Rhine-Westphalia, and flows in a southerly direction. On its way to the Wied it initially crosses the territories of Werkhausen, Hasselbach and Forstmehren. It then forms the boundary between the parishes of Ersfeld and Kraam and flows through the village of Mehren in a southerly direction. South of Hirz-Maulsbach to its confluence, the Mehrbach forms the boundary between the districts of Neuwied on the right and Altenkirchen on the left, apart from a break near .

Its left hand tributaries are (from the source) the Werkhausener Bach, the Weyerbuscher Bach and the Ahlbach. Its right bank tributaries are the streams of Retterserbach (called the Scherenbach near its source and also called the Peschbach near Ersfeld), Friesbach, Maulsbach, Hirzbach and Krumbach.

From the hamlet of Dasbach to its mouth the Mehrbach flows through the Rhine-Westerwald Nature Park.

See also 
List of rivers of Rhineland-Palatinate

References 

Rivers of the Westerwald
Neuwied (district)
Altenkirchen (district)
Rivers of Rhineland-Palatinate
Rivers of Germany